The following list illustrates various frequencies, measured in hertz, according to decade in the order of their magnitudes, with the negative decades illustrated by events and positive decades by acoustic or electromagnetic uses.

See also
Hertz

References

Frequency
Temporal rates